The 2010 Pendle Borough Council election took place on 6 May 2010 to elect members of Pendle Borough Council in Lancashire, England. One third of the council was up for election and the council stayed under no overall control.

After the election, the composition of the council was
Conservative 17
Liberal Democrat 16
Labour 13
British National Party 2
Independent 1

Background
Before the election the Liberal Democrats ran the council, but without a majority, with 18 seats. The Conservatives held 16 seats, Labour 11, the British National Party 2 and there was 1 independent. 16 seats were contested in the election with the Liberal Democrats defending 7, both the Conservative and Labour parties 4 each and the British National Party defended 1 seat.

Election result
The results saw no party win a majority on the council after the Conservatives gained a seat to become the largest party on the council with 17 councillors. The Liberal Democrats dropped 3 to 16 seats, while Labour gained 2 seats to move to 13 councillors. Overall turnout in the election was 66.4%.

Following the election Conservative Mike Blomeley became leader of the council, after the council meeting saw the Conservative and Labour councillors support an all-party executive. The Liberal Democrats rejected this and refused to serve on the council executive, as they opposed giving Labour any power over housing decisions.

Ward results

References

2010 English local elections
May 2010 events in the United Kingdom
2010
2010s in Lancashire